Al-Naḍr ibn al-Ḥārith ibn ʿAlqama ibn Kalada ibn ʿAbd Manāf ibn Abd al-Dār ibn Quṣayy (d. 624 CE) was an Arab pagan physician who is considered one of the greatest Qurayshi opponents to the Islamic prophet Muhammad. He was captured after the Battle of Badr as one of the pagan fighters and flagbearers and was sentenced to death for his participation and persecution of the prophet Muhammed and Muslims in Mecca. The execution was conducted by Ali Ibn Abi Talib by beheading him in front of the Prophet and companions at as-Safra', before they had returned to Medina from the battle.

According to the Seerah, two captives – Al-Naḍr ibn al-Ḥārith and 'Uqbah ibn Abū Mu'ayṭ were executed during this event, the former by Ali and the latter by Asim bin Thabit Al-Ansari. According to Professor Sarah Bowen Savant, the event is claimed to have inspired Nadr's relative Qutayla to compose an elegy on his death, upbraiding Muhammad for the execution.

Life
During the Meccan period, Nadr was known as one of the authors a document advocating for the boycott of the small Muslim community by withholding the sale of any goods, effectively leading to their starvation. He is also considered one of the greatest opponents to the Islamic prophet Muhammad and his message during from Meccan era, and a propeller of their persecution. Per Islamic traditionists like Muqatil ibn Sulayman, Nadr had also accused Muhammad of plagiarism in his Quranic verses based on the stories of ancient people. He was captured after the Battle of Badr after his army was defeated in their offensive and was executed for his participation and involvements in Meccan persecutions. Muhammad Mohar Ali also names Al-Nadr as one of the assassins who tried to kill Muhammad before his migration to Medina. British Orientalist David Samuel Margoliouth, however, claims that he was executed for his challenge and ridiculing Muhammad, and that this version is supported by some ninth and tenth-century Muslim sources including Tabari who cites an oral report of Muhammad justifying his order on basis of Nadr accusing him. Al-Waqidi mentions a report that when Nadr asked the Muslims why he was to be executed, they replied that it was for his persecuting and torturing the Muslim as well as ridiculing the Quran.

Quran verse about the beheading of an-Nadir bin al-Harith

Ibn Kathir also mentions this incident in his book Tafsir Ibn Kathir and states the Quran verse Quran 8:31 was revealed about an-Nadir bin al-Harith. Ibn Kathir's commentary on Quran 8:31 and Quran 8:5 is as follows:

References

624 deaths
Date of birth unknown
Date of death unknown
People executed by decapitation
Place of birth unknown
Place of death unknown
Year of birth unknown
7th-century Arabs
7th-century executions